The Central Michigan Railroad (CMGN) was a railroad that operated former Grand Trunk Western Railroad (GTW) north of Durand, Michigan, and other lines in the area.

History 
The Central Michigan Railroad was formed in 1987 when the Straits Corporation bought GTW lines north of Durand. The line from Coopersville to Marne would be sold to the Coopersville & Marne Railroad in 1989, and in 1990 the Muskegon route was sold to the Michigan Shore Railroad. In 2004, Central Michigan Railroad was bought by RailAmerica, which had merged it into the Huron and Eastern Railway.

External links 
Central Michigan Railroad on intraspec
Central Michigan Railroad on Railroad Picture Archives

References

 Rail transportation in Michigan
 Michigan railroads